An instalment (or installment in American English) usually refers to either:
 Installment loan
 A single payment within a staged payment plan of a loan or a hire purchase (installment plan)
 An episode in a television or radio series
 An entry in a film and/or video game series
 Serial (literature), a publishing format under which a single large work is presented in contiguous successive publications